Anthony Spanos (born 5 May 1995) is an Australian actor. He has starred in the Australian television series Streetsmartz and more recently Trapped. He attended Trinity College in Perth, Western Australia.

Trapped 
In the children/teenage television series Trapped (2008, Northway Productions Pty Ltd, 7 Network), Spanos plays the character of Josh Jacobs. When the mysterious disappearance of their parents from a remote scientific research station takes place, they leave a group of children trapped in a dangerous paradise.

Streetsmartz 
Spanos plays the character of Hector Papdopoulos in the children/teenage television series Streetsmartz (2005–2006, Nine Network). Streetsmartz is centered on the lives of a group of children, their friends and family who live in Fremantle, in Western Australia. Three series, with a total of 39 episodes, were screened.

The character of Hector is described as 'nine going on nineteen'. He's a sidekick and partner to his brother's business ventures but often reluctantly – Hector is more interested in having fun and causing havoc than in actually
working.

Castaway 
Spanos appeared in Castaway, a spin-off from Trapped. He reprised the character of Josh Jacobs.

References 

Australian male television actors
Living people
1995 births